Loud and Clear is the first album of the glam metal band Buster Brown.

After this album, drummer Bob Koestel was replaced by drummer James Kottak.

Track listing

 Loud And Clear (Johnny Edwards, Allan Phelps) 4:17
 Under Control (Edwards, Phelps) 3:35
 Little Bit Of Love (Edwards, Phelps) 4:06
 Killing Time (Phelps) 3:46
 Get It Up (Phelps) 2:42
 Bad Dreams (Kevin Downs, Edwards, Phelps) 3:28
 Comin' On Strong (Edwards, Phelps) 3:33
 I Don't Want You No More (Edwards, Phelps) 3:33
 Ground Zero (Edwards, Downs) 3:12
 Days Across The Nile (Cook, Phelps) 2:06

Personnel
 Johnny Edwards: Lead Vocals
 Allan Phelps: Guitar
 Kevin Downs: Bass
 Bob Koestel: Drums

Buster Brown (band) albums
1984 debut albums